Aniruddha Prasad Yadav is an Indian politician. He was elected to the Bihar Legislative Assembly from Kishanpur in 2005 and Nirmali in the 2010 Bihar Legislative Assembly as a member of the Janata Dal (United).

References

Bihar MLAs 2015–2020
Janata Dal (United) politicians
1949 births
Living people
Bihar MLAs 2020–2025